The Kedah Sultanate (كسلطانن قدح) is a Muslim dynasty located in the Malay Peninsula. It was originally an independent state, but became a British protectorate in 1909. Its monarchy was abolished after it was added to the Malayan Union but was restored and added to the Malayan Union's successor, the Federation of Malaya.

The information regarding the formation of this sultanate and the history before and after its creation comes from the "Kedah Annals". The annals were written in the 18th century, over a millennium after the formation of the supposed Kedah Kingdom. It describes the first king of Kedah as arriving on the shores of Kedah as a result of an attack by a mythical gigantic beast. It states that the nation was founded by the offspring of Alexander the Great. However, Thai chronicles mention that Kedah was a Thai city like Nakhon Si Thammarat and was a part of the Siamese kingdom but later was changed into a Malay state after invasion by Muslim kingdoms until today.

The Kedah Annals provides unreliable information on the sultans of Kedah, listing the first sultan of Kedah as Sultan Mudzafar Shah I in 1136, while an Acehnese account gives the conversion to Islam on 1474. Although not impossible, the year 1136 is also unlikely since it pre-dates the Terengganu Inscription Stone by almost three centuries. Claims made by the Kedah Annals also directly contradict the fact that the Buddhist Srivijaya kingdom was in direct control of Kedah at the time Sultan Mudzafar Shah I allegedly converted the region to a sultanate. Kedah may have remained Hindu-Buddhist until the 15th century.

History

Around 788 BCE, a systematic government of a large settlement of Malay native of Kedah had already established around the northern bank of the Merbok River. The state consisted of a large area of the Bujang Valley, covering the Merbok and Muda River branches in an approximately 1000-square mile area. The capital of the settlement was built at the estuary of a branch of the Merbok River, now known as Sungai Batu. Around 170 CE, groups of Hindu adherents arrived at Kedah, who were soon joined by peoples from nearby islands and from the northern Mon-Khmer region. At the same time, traders from India, Persia and the Arabian peninsula arrived at the brink of the Malacca Strait, using Gunung Jerai (the Kedah Peak) as a marking point. Ancient Kedah covered the areas of Kuala Bahang, Kuala Bara, Kuala Pila and Merpah.

The king from Gombroon
According to At-Tarikh Salasilah Negeri Kedah, written by Muhammad Hassan bin Dato' Kerani Muhammad Arshad in 1928, in about 630 CE, Maharaja Derbar Raja of Gombroon (now known as Bandar Abbas) in Persia was defeated in battle and escaped to Sri Lanka, and was later blown off course by a storm to the remote shores of Kuala Sungai Qilah, Kedah. The inhabitants of Kedah found him to be a valiant and intelligent person and made him the king of Kedah. In 634 CE, a new kingdom was formed in Kedah consisting of Persian royalty and native Malay people of Hindu faith; the capital was Langkasuka.

Conversion to Islam
Based on the account given in Hikayat Merong Mahawangsa (also known as the Kedah Annals), the Sultanate of Kedah was formed when King Phra Ong Mahawangsa converted to Islam and adopted the name Sultan Mudzafar Shah. At-Tarikh Salasilah Negeri Kedah described the conversion to Islamic faith as starting in 1136 AD. However, historian Richard Winstedt, quoting an Acehnese account, gave a date of 1474 for the year of conversion to Islam by the ruler of Kedah. This later date accords with an account in the Malay Annals, which describes a raja of Kedah visiting Malacca during the reign of its last sultan seeking the honour of the royal band that marks the sovereignty of a Malay Muslim ruler. The request by Kedah was in response to be Malacca's vassal, probably due to fears of Ayutthayan aggresion.

British colonisation of Penang and Seberang Perai
The first British vessel arrived in Kedah in 1592. In 1770, Francis Light was instructed by the British East India Company (BEIC) to take Penang from Kedah. He achieved this by assuring Sultan Muhammad Jiwa Zainal Adilin II that his army would protect Kedah from any Siamese invasion. In return, the sultan agreed to hand over Penang to the British. In 1786, Light negotiated with the new sultan of Kedah, Abdullah Mukarram Shah, over the cession of Penang to the BEIC. However, Light made the agreement without the consent of his superiors in India. The BEIC did not provide military support, as promised by Light, when Siam attacked Kedah. The sultan demanded that Light return Penang, but Light was reluctant to hand it back. He offered compensation for the damage but was refused by the sultan. In 1790, Abdullah planned to launch an amphibious invasion of the island of Penang to recapture it. The BEIC with the help of the British military made a preemptive strike and attacked Kedah's navy and fort in Seberang Perai, damaging them. The sultan signed a ceasefire agreement with Light in 1791.

On 7 July 1800, while George Alexander William Leith was Lieutenant-Governor of Penang, a treaty came into effect that gave the British sovereignty over Seberang Perai, subsequently named Province Wellesley. The treaty, negotiated by Penang's First Assistant George Caunter and Sultan of Kedah Dziaddin Mukarram Shah II, increased the annual payment to the sultan from 6,000 to 10,000 Spanish dollars per annum. While the acquisition improved Penang Island's military and food security, for Kedah it provided a protective strip against enemy attack from the sea. The treaty also provided for the free flow of food and commodities from Kedah to Penang Island and Province Wellesley. To this day, the Malaysian federal government still pays Kedah, on behalf of Penang, RM 10,000 annually as a symbolic gesture.

Partition of Kedah

After the death of Sultan Abdullah Mukarram Shah in 1797, the throne was given to his half brother Sultan Dziaddin Mukarram Shah II. However Sultan Dziaddin was forced to abdicate in 1803 by the king of Siam and was replaced by his nephew Sultan Ahmad Tajuddin II. This sparked a succession crisis as crown prince, Tunku Bisnu claimed to be the rightful heir to the throne. Fearing civil war, the Siamese kingdom reconciled the two parties by appointing Tunku Bisnu as ruler of Setul, thus establishing the Kingdom of Setul Mambang Segara in 1808. In 1892, the kingdom was reunified with the Kedah Sultanate. However, the assimilation of the Siamese people and their culture in Setul had weakened Kedah rule over it. The Anglo-Siamese Treaty in 1909 finally ended Kedah rule over Setul, as the Siamese and British agreed to exclude Setul from Kedah jurisdiction, thus separating Kedah and Setul.

List of rulers
The list of rulers of Kedah as given here is based to some extent on the Kedah Annals beginning with the Hindu ruler Durbar Raja I. According to the Kedah Annals, the 9th Kedah maharaja, Derbar Raja, converted to Islam and changed his name to Sultan Muzaffar Shah, thereby starting the Kedah sultanate. A genealogy was compiled in the 1920s, Al-Tarikh Salasilah Negeri Kedah Darul Aman or Kedah Genealogy. The historicity and the dating of the list of rulers however is questionable as Kedah may have remained Hindu-Buddhist until the 15th century when its king converted to Islam.

Hindu era
The following is a list of kings of Kedah Kingdom. Each used the Hindu title of Sri Paduka Maharaja. The exact dates of each king's reign are not known, and the dates given are speculative.

 Durbar Raja I (330–390)
 Diraja Putra (390–440)
 Maha Dewa I (440–465)
 Karna Diraja (465–512)
 Karma (512–580)
 Maha Dewa II (580–620)
 Maha Dewa III (620–660)
 Diraja Putra II (660–712)
 Darma Raja (712–788)
 Maha Jiwa (788–832)
 Karma II (832–880)
 Darma Raja II (880–956)
 Durbar Raja II (956–1136; succeeded as Sultan of Kedah, see below)
Source for the list of sultans is the Muzium Negeri Kedah, Alor Setar, Malaysia. "The sultans of Kedah".

Islamic era

The beginning of the use of the title sultan in Kedah is attributed to a visit by a Muslim scholar from Yemen, Sheikh Abdullah bin Ja'afar Quamiri, to Durbar Raja II's palace at Bukit Meriam in 1136. The audience resulted in the king's conversion to Islam. He adopted the name Mudzaffar Shah and established the sultanate of Kedah.

The source for the list of sultans given here is the official genealogy given for the sultan of Kedah. There are however discrepancies with the Kedah Annals as it lists only five sultans from the first convert Mudzaffar Shah to Sulaiman Shah, who was captured by Aceh in 1619, in contrast to the twelve listed here. The rest of the list largely follows as that given in the Kedah Annals with the exception of a few changes and more recent updates in the 20th and 21st century.

Culture

Nobat
The nobat musical instruments of Nagara and Nepiri were introduced to Kedah by Maharaja Derbar Raja. The instrument is also called semambu. The band is led by the king, and it consists of drums, a gong, a flute and a trumpet. Today, nobat is a royal orchestra, played only during royal ceremonies such as inaugurations, weddings, and funerals. The building which houses the instruments and where the ensemble rehearses is known as the Balai Nobat, literally the Office of Nobat, in Alor Setar city proper.

See also
 Bujang Valley
 Hikayat Merong Mahawangsa
 Sultanate of Johor
 Sultanate of Malacca
 Sultanate of Singgora
 Kingdom of Kubang Pasu Darul Qiyam, another historical Malay Kingdom born during the Partition of Kedah
 Family tree of Kedah monarchs
 Family tree of Malaysian monarchs
 List of Sunni Muslim dynasties

Notes

References

 Mohammad Isa Othman, Politik Tradisional Kedah 1681–1942, Dewan Bahasa dan Pustaka, Kuala Lumpur, 1990

 Ibrahim Bakar (Ed.), At-Tarikh Salasilah Negeri Kedah Darul Aman by Muhammad Hassan bin Dato' Kerani Muhammad Arshad, Persatuan Sejarah Malaysia Cawangan Kedah, Alor Setar Kedah, 2018

External links
 List of Kedah sultans
 Nobat  

 
Kedah
History of Kedah
Former countries in Malaysian history
Former countries in Thai history
Feudalism in Malaysia
Muslim dynasties
British Malaya
Former British colonies and protectorates in Asia
States and territories established in 1136
States and territories disestablished in 1941
1136 establishments in Asia
1941 disestablishments in Asia
States and territories established in 1945
States and territories disestablished in 1946
1945 establishments in British Malaya
1945 establishments in Southeast Asia
1946 disestablishments in Asia
1940s disestablishments in British Malaya
1940s disestablishments in Southeast Asia